Mont-de-l'If is a former commune in the Seine-Maritime department in the Normandy region in northern France. On 1 January 2016, it was merged into the new commune of Saint Martin de l'If.

Geography

Population

Places of interest
 The church of the Trinity, dating from the eleventh century.

See also
Communes of the Seine-Maritime department

References

Former communes of Seine-Maritime